One Last Thing is a 2018 American drama film directed by Tim Rouhana, starring Wendell Pierce, Jurnee Smollett and Joanne Froggatt.

Cast
 Wendell Pierce as Dylan
 Jurnee Smollett as Lucy
 Joanne Froggatt as Jaime
 April Billingsley as Lindsey
 Elizabeth Ludlow as Alex
 David Kronawitter as Dr. Akers
 Adora Dei as Dr. Ngawa
 Eric Mendenhall as Dr. Green
 Ed Amatrudo as Dr. Richards
 Kate Kovach as Mary
 Lisa Arrindell Anderson as Margo
 L. Warren Young as Xavier Cruz
 Tara Ochs as Rhonda

Release
The film was released in theatres on 13 June 2018 and was made available on demand on 15 June.

Reception
Jamie Broadnax of Black Girl Nerds wrote that while the film's pacing "tends to slow down at times", the storyline overall is "incredible" and the character development "evolves well". Broadnax also praised the performances of Pierce and Smollett, calling them "compelling".

Frank Scheck of The Hollywood Reporter praised the performances of Smollett and Pierce, but wrote that their "fine efforts" are "not enough to lift the mediocre One Last Thing above its basic cable-level veneer."

References

External links
 
 

American drama films
2018 drama films